The baseball competition at the 2023 Central American and Caribbean Games will be held at the Parque nacional de Pelota Saturnino Bengoa in San Salvador, El Salvador from 25 June to 1st July 2023.

Participating nations 
A total of 8 countries qualified athletes. The number of athletes a nation entered is in parentheses beside the name of the country.

Medal summary

References

External links

2023 Central American and Caribbean Games events

Central American and Caribbean Games

2023